Overton is a city in Rusk and Smith counties in the U.S. state of Texas. Overton lies in two counties as well as two metropolitan areas. The Rusk County portion of the city is part of the Longview Metropolitan Statistical Area, while the Smith County portion is part of the Tyler Metropolitan Statistical Area.

The population was 2,275 at the 2020 census.

History

It was known to the Choctaws, Chickasaws, and Creeks who lived in the area as Tiyuk Hekia (Standing Pine); many years later, when it was incorporated, it became known as Overton.

The town was named after Major Frank Overton, an early settler and landowner who donated some of his land for the town site. It was platted in 1873 and a post office was granted that year.

Overton was originally intended to be a crossroads for two railroads. In 1875, the Henderson and Overton Branch Railroad, 16 miles long, was completed and was later joined by the International-Great Northern. When the nearby communities of Bellview, Jamestown, Rocky Mount, and Salem were all bypassed by the railroad, Overton gained the businesses and people who wanted to benefit from the railroad lines. The town offered lots for businesses to relocate, and many took the offer.

The Masons and Odd Fellows built the first school, and a church was constructed in 1875. By 1888 the population had increased to 500 and had all essential businesses, including a newspaper. Overton prospered as an agricultural community, and in 1904 the population had reached 568.

Oklahoman wildcatter C. M. (Dad) Joiner was drilling his third well in 1930,  and the town of Overton helped raise the funds he needed to drill. When the well came in, Overton shared in Joiner's success, as churches, schools, and a refinery were built. Hubbard College was founded during this time as well. The town's once agrarian-based economy suddenly revolved entirely around the production of oil.

Overton's population skyrocketed from 426 in 1931 to 3,000 in 1933. By 1936 it was up to 4,500 and the town went through the Great Depression relatively unscathed. But by the end of World War II the population had declined by half—reaching just 2,000 in the 1950s and remaining at that level through the 1970s. In the 1980s Overton was Rusk County's "second city" with a population of 2,430 in 1983. By the 1990s Overton extended into neighboring Smith County.

The City of Overton has had a storied history with Radical Groups claiming the site as their base of operations. The Republic of Texas operated within the City Limits from the Early 2000s, up until the building was mysteriously burned down. Overton has a historical voting base consisting primarily of older, Republican-leaning voters.

Geography

Overton is located at  (32.273608, –94.976306).

According to the United States Census Bureau, the city has a total area of 6.8 square miles (17.5 km), of which 6.7 square miles (17.4 km) is land and 0.04 square mile (0.1 km) (0.59%) is water. Most of the city lies in Rusk County, with a small portion extending into Smith County.

Major highways

  State Highway 135
  State Highway 323

Demographics

As of the 2020 United States census, there were 2,275 people, 826 households, and 580 families residing in the city.

As of the census of 2010, there were 2,554 people, 935 households, and 639 families residing in the city. The population density was 375.6 people per square mile. There were 1,086 housing units at an average density of 159.7 per square mile. The racial makeup of the city was 80% White, 16.1% African American, 0.4% Native American, 1.4% from other races, and 2.1% from two or more races. 4% of the population are Hispanic or Latino of any race.

There were 935 households, out of which 32.8% had children under the age of 18 living with them, 47.7% were married couples living together, 15.6% had a female householder with no husband present, and 31.7% were non-families. 27.7% of all households were made up of individuals, and 13.2% had someone living alone who was 65 years of age or older. The average household size was 2.6 and the average family size was 3.18.

In the city, the population was spread out, with 26.9% under the age of 18, 5.8% from 20 to 24, 25.2% from 25 to 44, 23.5% from 45 to 64, and 15.2% who were 65 years of age or older. The median age was 35.2 years.

The median income for a household in the city was $32,292, and the median income for a family was $55,261. The per capita income for the city was $18,987. Males had a median income of $28,496 versus $17,237 for females.

Government

Local government

State government
Overton is represented in the Texas Senate by Republican Kevin Eltife, District 1. The Rusk County portion of Overton is represented in the Texas House of Representatives by Republican Travis Clardy, District 11. The Smith County portion of Overton is represented in the Texas House of Representatives by Republican Bryan Hughes, District 5.

Federal government
At the federal level, the two U.S. Senators from Texas are Republicans John Cornyn and Ted Cruz; Overton is part of Texas' US Congressional 1st District, which is currently represented by Republican Louie Gohmert.

Economy

Organization 

The Overton Economic Development Corporation (EDC) is a community team made up of resident executives and business owners, responsible for attracting new investment and helping expand existing businesses within the city. With a seven-member board, the Overton EDC is funded by a $.0025 sales tax that allows the EDC to accomplish its goals.

Business assistance 

Overton EDC provides business assistance to qualifying companies. They evaluate incentives for businesses to locate or expand in the Overton area and base their findings on taxes assessed and paid, the number of jobs created or retained, wages paid, local purchases of products and services, indirect employment gains and the general benefit of furthering the mission of the city of Overton Economic Development Corporation.

They primarily seek businesses in manufacturing, production, medical/health, hospitality and distribution. Funds may be used in land lease/purchase, building lease/purchase, rehabilitation or construction, capital equipment purchase, infrastructure improvements or employee training.

Funds may not be used for venture or equity capital, working capital/inventories or personal loans. Forms of business assistance include loans/loan guarantees, SBA 504, SBA 7(A) guaranteed and direct loan, and the rural economic development fund.

Education
Most of the City of Overton is served by the Overton Independent School District. The Arp Independent School District and the West Rusk ISD serves small portions of the town.

Media

Newspaper
Overton Press (Closed in June 2011)
Overton News
Henderson Daily News

Notable people

 Jerry L. Buchmeyer, was a retired senior United States District Judge for the Northern District of Texas in Dallas, Texas
 Robert Lee Howze, graduated from the United States Military Academy in 1888 and was a Major General who received the Medal of Honor during the Indian Wars
 Michael "Bo" Kelly, is a former American football fullback in the Arena Football League. Kelly starred for the Arizona Rattlers and Carolina Cobras, retiring in 2007 as the AFL all-time rushing yards leader
 Clyde Lee, served as head coach for several sports at Overton High School before moving on to a successful career at the University of Houston
 Earle Bradford Mayfield, was a lawyer and Democratic Party politician from Overton, Texas who served in both the Texas State Senate and United States Senate
 Max McGee, football wide receiver in the NFL, played professionally for the Green Bay Packers; born in Overton

Climate
The climate in this area is characterized by hot, humid summers and generally mild to cool winters.  According to the Köppen Climate Classification system, Overton has a humid subtropical climate, abbreviated "Cfa" on climate maps.

References

External links
 
Texas Escapes Online Magazine
USA Cities Online
City of Overton Texas
City-Data.com
Overton in the Handbook of Texas

Cities in Texas
Cities in Rusk County, Texas
Cities in Smith County, Texas
Longview metropolitan area, Texas